Caleta Olivia is a city located at the northeast of the Argentine province of Santa Cruz, on the San Jorge Gulf by the Atlantic Ocean. It is the second most important city of the province after Rio Gallegos, and the most populated of the Deseado Department.

The city was founded on November 20, 1901, by Navy Lieutenant Exequiel Guttero, captain of the Guardia Nacional, a ship that was transporting cables, equipment, and workers for the construction of a telegraph line south of Comodoro Rivadavia. The settlement was given the name of his wife Olivia (caleta means "small bay", "inlet").

The main economic activities around the city are petroleum, sheep and fishing. Its port serves both as a fishing centre, and as an export point for locally produced goods.

Among the monuments of the city, probably the most characteristic is that of "El Gorosito," built to honour a petroleum industry worker.

Climate
The city has a cold semi-arid climate (Köppen climate classification BSk) with warm summers and cold winters. Precipitation is sparse, averaging  a year.

Despite the southern latitude, the city has moderate temperatures due to the regulation of the ocean, with beaches visited during sunny days in summer, where different water and sand sports are practiced.

See also

Water supply problems in Caleta Olivia 2014

References

External links
 Caleta Olivia, Portal a los Hielos Eternos — Portal of the city (in Spanish)
 WelcomeArgentina — General and touristic overview of Caleta Olivia.
 

Port settlements in Argentina
Populated places in Santa Cruz Province, Argentina
Populated places established in 1901
Populated coastal places in Argentina
Cities in Argentina
Argentina
Santa Cruz Province, Argentina